Admirals of Sweden have existed since 1522.

History
In Sweden, the admiral's rank first appeared during the reign of Gustav I, who in 1522 gave it to Erik Fleming, a Council of the Realm. During Gustav's reign as king and throughout the latter part of the 16th century, the highest command of a fleet was led by a översteamiral ("colonel admiral"), to whose assistant a underamiral was appointed. It was not until 1569 that a permanent översteamiral was appointed; In 1602 the title was exchanged for riksamiral ("Admiral of the Realm"). The first permanent underamiral was appointed in 1575; his office ceased in 1619. Vice admiral is first mentioned in 1577. The admirals of the Swedish Navy have, incidentally, been as follows: generalamiral ("general admiral"), amiralgeneral ("admiral general"), storamiral ("grand admiral"), överamiral, riksviceamiral ("Vice Admiral of the Realm"), amiralgenerallöjtnant ("admiral lieutenant general"), amirallöjtnant ("lieutenant admiral"), schoutbynacht and konteramiral ("rear admiral").

Riksamiraler (Admirals of the Realm)
Clas Eriksson Fleming 1571–1595
Joachim Scheel 1596–1602
Axel Nilsson Ryning 1602–1611
Göran Nilsson Gyllenstierna 1611–1618
Carl Gyllenhielm 1620–1650
Gabriel Bengtsson Oxenstierna 1652–1656
Carl Gustaf Wrangel 1657–1664
Gustav Otto Stenbock 1664–1675

Amiralgeneraler (Admiral Generals)
Hans Wachtmeister 1681
Lorentz Creutz Sr. 1675

Generalamiraler (General Admirals)
Henrik Horn 1677
Henrik af Trolle 1780
Anton Johan Wrangel the elder 1784
Carl August Ehrensvärd 1792
Johan af Puke 1812
Victor von Stedingk 1818
Rudolf Cederström 1823

Överamiraler
Claes Sparre 1715
Edvard Didrik Taube 1734
Carl Georg Siöblad 1747
Johan Gustaf Lagerbjelke 1809

Amirallöjtnanter (Lieutenant Admirals)
Herman Fleming 1645

Amiraler (Admirals)
Ivar Fleming 1534
Jakob Bagge 1555
Nils Jespersson Kruse 1563
Klas Kristersson Horn af Åminne 1564
Bengt Halstensson Bagge 1569
Herman Fleming 1574
Hans Claësson Bjelkenstjerna 1611
Clas Fleming 1620
Nils Göransson Stiernsköld 1627
Åke Ulfsparre 1640
Mårten Anckarhielm 1653
Göran Göransson Gyllenstierna the elder 1640
Klas Hansson Bjelkenstjerna 1654
Sten Nilsson Bielke 1657
Claes Nilsson Stiernsköld 1661
Claes Uggla 1670
Erik Carlsson Sjöblad 1676
Hans Clerck 1676
Johan Bär 1676
Johan Olofsson Bergenstierna 1676
Gustaf Adolph Sparre 1690
Cornelius Anckarstjerna 1692
Evert Fredrik Taube 1700
Jacob De Prou 1709
Axel Johan Lewenhaupt 1712
Gustaf Wattrang 1712
Erik Johan Lillie 1715
Gustaf von Psilander 1715
Mikael Henck 1715
Carl Henrik von Löwe 1719
Jonas Fredrik Örnfelt 1719
Olof Strömstierna 1719
Nils Ehrenschiöld 1721
Olof von Unge 1734
Gustaf Grubbe 1736
Jean von Utfall 1742
Theodor Ankarcrona 1742
Abraham Falkengréen 1749
Carl Hans Sparre 1754
Erik Arvid Sparre 1755
Didrik Henrik Taube 1768
Nils Lillienanckar 1771
Carl Vilhelm Modée 1793
Salomon von Rajalin 1809
Henrik Johan Nauckhoff 1817
Magnus Palmqvist 1818
Per Gustaf Lagerstråle 1818
Carl Fredrik Coyet 1827
Johan Lagerbielke 1827
Otto Gustaf Nordensköld 1845
Johan Henrik Kreüger 1857
Carl August Gyllengranat 1858
Carl Magnus Ehnemark 1862
Christian Anders Sundin 1884
Carl Gustaf von Otter 1889
Louis Palander af Vega 1900
Fredrik von Otter 1900
Hjalmar af Klintberg 1903
King Gustav V 1907
Carl Hjulhammar 1911
Wilhelm Dyrssen 1923
Carl August Ehrensvärd 1924
Henning von Krusenstierna 1927
Otto Lybeck 1936
Fabian Tamm 1947
King Gustaf VI Adolf 1950
Stig H:son Ericson 1961
The Duke of Halland 1969
Åke Lindemalm 1970
King Carl XVI Gustaf 1973
Bengt Lundvall 1978
Bror Stefenson 1991

Viceamiraler (Vice Admirals)
Henrik Fleming 1628
Peter Blume 1644
Richard Clerck 1657
Nils Ehrenschiöld 1716
Olof von Unge 1734
Anton Johan Wrangel the elder 1740
Thomas von Rajalin 1741
Hans Anckarcrantz 1754
Axel Lagerbielke 1758
Nils Brahe the younger 1760
Johan von Rajalin 1765
Sebald Hertman von Graman 1765
Christopher Falkengréen 1769
Carl Tersmeden 1774
Johan Nordenankar 1776
Otto Henrik Nordenskjöld 1790
Fredrik Henrik af Chapman 1791
Carl Olof Cronstedt 1801
Baltzar von Platen 1814
Carl Johan af Wirsén 1825
Gustaf af Klint 1825
Carl Reinhold Nordenskiöld 1858
Philip Virgin 1889
Knut Peyron 1897
Jarl Christerson 1898
The Count of Wisborg 1903
Carl Olsen 1908
Ludvig Sidner 1911
Gustaf Dyrssen 1917
Gustaf Lagercrantz 1919
Carl Alarik Wachtmeister 1925
Henry Lindberg 1925
Fredrik Riben 1930
John Schneidler 1932
Charles de Champs 1934
Harald Åkermark 1934
Claës Lindsström 1942
Hans Simonsson 1945
Helge Strömbäck 1945
Gunnar Bjurner 1947
Gösta Ehrensvärd 1950
Erik Anderberg 1957
Erik Samuelson 1958
Gunnar Jedeur-Palmgren 1962
Erik af Klint 1966
Bertil Berthelsson 1967
Oscar Krokstedt 1968
Sigurd Lagerman 1968
Holger Henning 1970
Einar Blidberg 1971
Karl Segrell 1971
Per Rudberg 1978
Bengt Schuback 1978
Dick Börjesson 1990
Peter Nordbeck 1994
Frank Rosenius 1998
Jan Thörnqvist 2016
Jonas Haggren 2018

Konteramiraler (Rear admirals)
Per Lilliehorn 1789
Carl Fredrik Eneskjöld 1793
Harald af Cristiernin 1795
Georg Christian de Frese 1797
Måns von Rosenstein 1797
Carl Adolph Danckwardt 1800
Claes Hjelmstjerna 1800
Carl Fredric Aschling 1808
Maurits Peter von Krusenstierna 1809
Carl Edvard Carlheim-Gyllensköld 1811
Hans Henrik Anckarheim 1812
Carl af Klint 1823
Claes August Cronstedt 1823
Johan Gustaf von Sydow 1844
Carl Ulner 1852
Salomon Mauritz von Krusenstierna 1861
Carl Henrik Kreüger 1881
Oscar Stackelberg 1886
Georg af Klercker 1892
Adolf Meister 1897
Fredrik Lennman 1899
Jacob Hägg 1899
Magnus Ingelman 1901
Otto Lindbom 1903
Theodor Sandström 1905
Arvid Lindman 1907
Sten Ankarcrona 1916
 Gustaf af Klint 1918
Bernhard Juel 1919
Albert Fallenius 1923
Carl Sparre 1923
Hans Ericson 1928
Gunnar Unger 1931
Karl Wester 1931
Prince Wilhelm, Duke of Södermanland 1938
Helge Friis 1938
Nils Wijkmark 1938
Yngve Schoerner 1939
Marc Giron 1942
Yngve Ekstrand 1942
Erik Wetter 1943
Göran Wahlström 1943
Harald Qvistgaard 1945
Carl Ekman 1948
Gösta Odqvist 1948
Elis Biörklund 1949
Eskil Gester 1952
Ragnar Wetterblad 1953
Moje Östberg 1955
Einar Blidberg 1957
Gunnar Fogelberg 1959
Stig Bergelin 1963
Hans C:son Uggla 1964
Dag Arvas 1966
Nils-Erik Ödman 1968
Christer Kierkegaard 1970
Gunnar Grandin 1970
Rolf Rheborg 1973
Bengt Rasin 1977
Carl-Fredrik Algernon 1978
Jan Enquist 1982
Ola Backman 1982
Göran Wallén 1984
Claes Tornberg 1985
Torbjörn Hultman 1989
Cay Holmberg 1990
Sten Swedlund 1990
Torsten Lindh 1994
Bertil Björkman 1997
Göran Larsbrink 2001
Jörgen Ericsson 2001
Anders Grenstad 2005
Leif Nylander c. 2005
Stefan Engdahl 2006
Odd Werin 2010
Thomas Engevall 2014
Jens Nykvist 2016
Ewa Skoog Haslum 2020
Jonas Wikström 2021

Flottiljamiraler (Rear admiral (lower half)/Flotilla admiral)
Mats Fogelmark ?
Peter Bager ?
Andreas Olsson ?
Stefan Engdahl 2000
Bengt Johansson 2002
Lars Salomonsson 2003
Bengt Jarvid 2008
Anders Olovsson 2016

See also
 Lord High Admiral of Sweden

References

 
Lists of Swedish military personnel
Sweden